Party Fever is a 1938 Our Gang short comedy film directed by George Sidney.  It was the 170th Our Gang short (171st episode, 82nd talking short, 83rd talking episode, and second MGM produced episode) that was released.

Plot
Once again, Alfalfa and Butch are bitter rivals for the affections of Darla. The nerdish Waldo comes up with a solution: Alfalfa and Butch will compete for the title of Junior Mayor of Greenpoint during Boys' Week, and whichever one wins will earn the honor of escorting Darla to the annual Strawberry Festival. But despite the strenuous efforts of both young candidates, a "dark horse" wins not only the election, but also the girl.

Cast

The Gang
 Carl Switzer as Alfalfa
 Darla Hood as Darla
 Eugene Lee as Porky
 Billie Thomas as Buckwheat
 Pete the Pup as Himself

Additional cast
 Tommy Bond as Butch
 Darwood Kaye as Waldo
 Sidney Kibrick as Woim
 Joe Levine as Kid bullied by Butch
 Frank Jaquet as Uncle Frank, the Mayor of Greenpoint

Crowd extras
Grace Bohanon, Bobby Callahan, Payne Johnson, Harold Switzer, Laura June Williams

Notes
Party Fever was the fifth consecutive entry made without George McFarland as Spanky, who would rejoin the series with the next entry, Aladdin's Lantern. It was also the last Our Gang short in which Pete the Pup would appear.

See also
 Our Gang filmography

References

External links
 
 
 

1938 films
1938 comedy films
American black-and-white films
Films directed by Gordon Douglas
Metro-Goldwyn-Mayer short films
Films directed by George Sidney
Our Gang films
1938 short films
1930s American films